Pavel Pavlovich Lobanov (January 15, 1902, Staro, Dmitrovsky District, Moscow Governorate – August 13, 1984, Moscow) was a Soviet statesman and economic leader. Deputy of the Supreme Soviet of the Soviet Union of 4, 5, 7–9 convocations. Member of the Central Auditing Commission of the All–Union Communist Party (Bolshevikss)(1939–1952), candidate member of the Central Committee of the Communist Party of the Soviet Union (1956–1961). Academician of the Lenin All–Union Academy of Agricultural Sciences (1948), Doctor of Economics (1967). Hero of Socialist Labour (1971).

Biography
Lobanov was born into a peasant family. He graduated from the Agronomic Faculty of the Moscow Agricultural Academy Named After Kliment Timiryazev in 1925.

1925 – agronomist of the Shakhovsky Section of the Volokolamsky Uyezd of the Moscow Region;
1925–1926 – served in the Workers' and Peasants' Red Army;
1926–1927 – agronomist for grain inspection of the elevator of the Moscow–Kazan railway;
1927–1930 – agronomist of the Kostroma District and district land administration;
1930–1931 – technical director of the Soviet Farm "Ilyich's Precepts", Ivanovo Oblast;
1931–1936 – postgraduate student at the All–Union Scientific Research Institute of Soviet Farms;
1936–1937 – head of the department of the Moscow Institute of Land Management;
1937 – Director of the Voronezh Agricultural Institute;
1937–1938 – Deputy People's Commissar of Agriculture of the Russian Soviet Federative Socialist Republic;
1938 – People's Commissar of Agriculture of the Russian Soviet Federative Socialist Republic;
1938–1946 – People's Commissar of Grain and Livestock Farms of the Soviet Union;
1946–1953 – Deputy, 1st Deputy Minister of Agriculture of the Soviet Union;
1953 – 1st Deputy Minister of Agriculture and Procurement of the Soviet Union;
1953–1955 – First Deputy Chairman of the Council of Ministers of the Russian Soviet Federative Socialist Republic and Minister of Agriculture and Procurement of the Russian Soviet Federative Socialist Republic (since 1953 – Minister of Agriculture of the Russian Soviet Federative Socialist Republic);
1955–1956 – Deputy Chairman of the Council of Ministers of the Soviet Union;
1956–1961 – President of the Lenin All–Union Academy of Agricultural Sciences and Chairman of the Council of the Union of the Supreme Soviet of the Soviet Union (until 1962);
1961–1965 – Deputy Chairman of the State Planning Committee of the Soviet Union;
1965–1978 – President of the Lenin All–Union Academy of Agricultural Sciences.

From 1978, he was a personal pensioner.

He died in 1984 and is buried in the city of Dmitrov.

Awards
Hero of Socialist Labour;
Two Orders of Lenin;
Order of the October Revolution;
Order of the Red Banner of Labour;
Order of Friendship of Peoples.

Sources

State Power of the Soviet Union. The Highest Authorities And Management And Their Leaders. 1923–1991. Historical and Biographical Reference Book / Compiled by Vladimir Ivkin. Moscow, 1999 –

External links

Lobanov Pavel Pavlovich – article from the Biographical Encyclopedia of the Russian Academy of Agricultural Sciences, All–Union Academy of Agricultural Sciences Named After Lenin
Biography in the Handbook of the History of the Communist Party of the Soviet Union

1902 births
1984 deaths
Heroes of Socialist Labour
Recipients of the Order of Lenin
Recipients of the Order of the Red Banner of Labour
Recipients of the Order of Friendship of Peoples
Soviet economists
People's commissars and ministers of the Soviet Union
Fourth convocation members of the Supreme Soviet of the Soviet Union
Fifth convocation members of the Supreme Soviet of the Soviet Union
Seventh convocation members of the Supreme Soviet of the Soviet Union
Eighth convocation members of the Supreme Soviet of the Soviet Union
Ninth convocation members of the Supreme Soviet of the Soviet Union
Chairmen of the Soviet of the Union
Central Committee of the Communist Party of the Soviet Union candidate members
Academicians of the VASKhNIL